The giant sunfish or bumphead sunfish (Mola alexandrini), (also known as the  Ramsay's sunfish, southern sunfish, southern ocean sunfish, short sunfish or bump-head sunfish in various parts of the world), is a fish belonging to the family Molidae. It is closely related to the more widely known Mola mola, and is found in the Southern Hemisphere. With a specimen found dead near Azores in 2021 weighing in at 2744 kg (6049 lb) it is the largest extant bony fish species in terms of maximum recorded mass by a wide margin.  It can be found basking on its side occasionally near the surface, which is thought to be used to re-heat themselves after diving in cold water for prey, recharge their oxygen stores, and attract gulls to free them of parasites.

Taxonomy

In December 2017, it was demonstrated that Mola alexandrini may be a senior synonym of Mola ramsayi (Ranzani 1839) through both historically and newly published morphological data. In July 2020, building upon this scientific learning, the larval forms of these species were discovered for the first time and confirmed with DNA analyses by Australian and New Zealander scientific teams.

The ocean sunfish are in the genus Mola, currently composed of three species: Mola mola, Mola alexandrini, Mola tecta. Also known as the southern ocean sunfish or southern sunfish, Mola alexandrini are commonly found in the epipelagic zone of the ocean which is the part of the ocean where enough light penetrates for photosynthesis to occur although recent studies also suggest that the sunfish are more common in deep waters than previously thought.

Description

Mola alexandrini has a relatively small mouth and its teeth fused into a parrot-like beak. Their bodies are flat and round, with large fins that they swish back and forth to propel themselves with as they swim horizontally. Their skin has rough denticles, leathery texture, with brown and gray coloring with pale blotches until death when they turn white. The body of the species has a thick white subcutaneous gelatinous layer that is smooth to the touch with a laterally compressed body covered in small rectangular scales. Both mola species have no caudal bones, ribs, or pelvic fins, and have fused vertebrae, leaving only their median fins to propel themselves. It can be recognized from the Mola mola by their lesser number of ossicles and lacking of a vertical band of denticles at its base. In Mola, the lower jaws are intact while the upper jaws are slightly forked. Also present on the head are lateral lines with small white rounded otoconia. On the sides of the fish are small gill openings that are covered by soft gill membrane and gill rakers which are covered under a subcutaneous gelatinous layer. In these species, all fins are spineless and triangular with pectoral fins being small and rounded, located midlaterally fitting into shallow grooves on sides of the body. Dorsal fins are located on both sides of the anal fin.

M. alexandrini can be distinguished by its unique characteristics of head bump, a chin bump, rectangular body scales, and rounded clavus. Although adult sunfish look generally similar, they are distinguishable using the seven characteristics: number of clavus fin rays, number of clavus ossicles, shape of clavus margin, presence of head bump, proportion of body length compared to body height, shape of body scales, and the presence of a chin bump.

Alongside these species, there are no external differences between sexes, however, the shape of gonads differs in males and females with females having a single ball-shaped ovary and males having a pair of elongated, rod-like testes.

Overall, the maximum recorded weight of M. alexandrini is 2,744 kg for a 325-cm total length specimen caught off the coast of Faial Island, Azores, Portugal in late 2021. With these records, this specimen is currently regarded as the world's heaviest bony fish specimen. It exceeds by nearly half a ton (444 kg) the largest previously known specimen (2300 kg), caught off Kamogawa, Japan in 1996.

Distribution

Mola alexandrini has been found all over the globe and is widely distributed throughout the world's oceans except for two polar regions; the Arctic and Antarctic. These species have been collected from waters off Japan, Taiwan, Galapagos Islands, New Zealand, Australia, Turkey, Oman, and Spain. It can be found in the southwest Pacific, especially around Australia and New Zealand, and the southeast Pacific around Chile. Its range also extends to the southeast Atlantic near South Africa. During different seasons on the Pacific side of Japan, M. alexandrini moves northward in the summer and southward in the winter. Seasonal migration is driven by temperature differences and productive frontal areas.

Habitat 

Although members of the genus Mola are found in many oceans throughout the world, this species thrives best in the open ocean of tropical and temperate seas preferring warmer temperatures with temperatures being between 16.8 C - 25.6 C and averaging 19.9 C . Many occurrences of these fish are linked to influences of ocean currents. With the environment, sunfish have different movement patterns. During the nighttime, these species stay in the same areas but, during the daytime, they stay below the thermocline. Vertical movement patterns correlated with thermocline depth and were distinct from December to May.

Development 

Over time, as this species develops, there are physical changes to the body. This includes a head bump forming from above the eyes to the front of the dorsal-fin base and a chin bump developing from beneath the lower jaw to beneath the pectoral fins. Additionally, developing with age are lateral ridges from above the head and below the eyes to beyond the pectoral fins. Characteristics that distinguish Mola alexandrini from other species in genus Mola are clavus ossicles, a snout ossicle and a chin ossicle that develop overtime with age. Transitioning from eggs into larvae, specimens can reach between 1.42 and 1.84 mm. At 1.42 mm, a globular shape is portrayed. As they move into the pre-juvenile stage, specimens reach between 5 mm to 59 mm. As they continue to grow, their body transitions into adult body proportions, including an elongated body. Once these species reach the juvenile stage, specimens are described to be as big as 305–750 mm in total length. Moving into adulthood, specimens are claimed to reach 4000 mm with well-defined features along with pigmentations of a gray, olive gray or blackish with a brown cast.

Reproduction 

Sunfish spawn in the outer circulation of temperate Atlantic, Pacific Oceans, and in the Mediterranean Sea. There is no absolute determination of when the best time is for spawning season, but research has shown that spawning in the Fall season and Winter seasons during the month of September result in bigger fish. Fertilization occurs when sperm and eggs are shed in the water.  Being that sunfish are so large, a single adult female can produce 300 million eggs. Unfertilized eggs were measured at 0.42-0.45 mm in diameter.

Lifespan 

Just like many other fish, high mortality rates are common for eggs, larvae, pre-juveniles, and small juveniles due to predators. There have been few reports on predation of Mola species however, predation by fish are from families Scombridae, Carangidae, Coryphaenidae, Xiphiidae, and Alepisauridae. Although there is not much research on the lifespan of ocean sunfish, it is said for ocean sunfish to take about 20 years for the species to reach a length of 3 m.

Behavior 

Sunfish swim by moving their dorsal and anal fins back and forth, both fins moving in the same direction at the same time. Adults are reported to travel mainly in pairs and sometimes in groups. Migrating from one place to another requires high tolerance and it is found that sunfish have high thermal tolerance undergoing quick and large temperature changes diving down the ocean several hundred meters. Sometimes, sunfish come up to the shallow water to recover from hypoxia from feeding below the thermocline. Like many other fish, sunfish adapt in response to the environment. During the daytime, sunfish showed diel movement patterns with depths deeper than the nighttime. During the nighttime, sunfish remained in temperatures between 18–24 C while the fish moved to different areas during the day time. Vertical shifts were correlated with temperature shifts.  Sunfish may dive deeper into cooler waters to cool the muscles or repay oxygen debts.

Diet 

Sunfish also feed on ctenophores, hydrozoans, and small crustaceans. It is also known for sunfish to swim up to the shallow water to eat cleaner fish and seabirds at the surface. Juvenile sunfish feed in coastal areas in the coastal food web while larger sunfish dive deeper. These species are active predators hunting in dynamic frontal systems.

Predation 

Predators include tiger sharks and orcas, though attacks are rare. Shark predation on all species of sunfish is sporadic, suggesting that ocean sunfish are of low quality or unpleasant for tiger sharks. With smart tactics, tiger sharks can stalk and ambush their prey and are able to bite through the thick gelatinous dermis.

Ecosystem roles 

The importance of ocean sunfish in marine food webs are unknown.  However, since ocean sunfish feed on gelatinous prey with a generalist diet, this suggests that these species play an important role in coastal food webs. If sunfish were to be removed as bycatch, it can drive localized trophic cascades with top-down control being reduced.

Economic importance for humans 

Sunfish have economic value in tourism industries. Seeing these fish are unpredictable, however, their unpredictable occurrences make exciting tours and recreational scuba diving. In locations like the Galapagos Islands and the Alboran Coast in the Mediterranean, sunfish are spotted frequent enough to have sunfish tours. Also, scuba diving tourism in Bali and the Nusa Penida islands have rapidly increased over the last few decades. Only a small number of fisheries target sunfish, including those in Taiwan and Japan. In Indonesia, sunfish are released, eaten by locals, used as bait, or end up at a fish market on rare occasions.

Conservation status 

The conservation status of M. alexandrini has not been evaluated aside from M. mola. Fisheries around the world catch ocean sunfish as bycatch. M.mola was listed by the international Union for the Conservation of Nature (IUCN) as "vulnerable" due to the high level of estimated bycatch in South African longline fishery with an annual estimated 340,000 annual catches. Both M. mola and M. alexandrini were listed as "high risk" bycatch species in the longline fishery off eastern Australia.  Threat levels are lower than what is stated on the IUCN listing in Australian, New Zealand, and South African fisheries. Currently, the Indonesian government, Ministry of Marine Affairs and Fisheries has placed sunfish on a plan for protection.

References

southern sunfish
Fish of Oceania
Fish described in 1839
Taxa named by Camillo Ranzani